Acrossocheilus longipinnis is a species of cyprinid fish from the Pearl River basin in southern China. It has sometimes been included as a subspecies of A. iridescens, but recent authorities recognize them as separate species. M. longipinnis reaches at least  in length.

References

Longipinnis
Freshwater fish of China
Endemic fauna of China
Fish described in 1939